Two for the Road is an album by American pianist Dave Grusin, of the music of Henry Mancini. It was released in 1997, recorded for GRP Records, and reached No. 1 on Billboard's Jazz chart.

Track listing
 All music composed by Henry Mancini, lyricists indicated
"Peter Gunn" - 4:41
"Dreamsville" (Jay Livingston, Ray Evans) - 4:38
"Mr. Lucky" - 4:23
"Moment to Moment" - 4:10
"Baby Elephant Walk" - 3:57
"Two for the Road" - 5:33
"Days of Wine and Roses (Johnny Mercer) - 5:33
"Hatari" - 4:56
"Whistling in the Dark" - 4:54
"Soldier in the Rain (Alan and Marilyn Bergman) - 4:56

Personnel
 Dave Grusin – piano, keyboards
 Gary Grant – trumpet
 Andy Martin – trombone
 Eric Marienthal, Dan Higgins, Tom Scott – saxophone
 John Pattitucci – double bass
 Russell Malone – guitar
 Harvey Mason – drums
 Paulinho Da Costa – percussion
 Diana Krall – vocals
 Tollak Ollestad - harmonica

Charts

References

External links
Dave Grusin-Two For The Road at Discogs
Dave Grusin-Two For The Road at AllMusic

1989 albums
GRP Records albums
Dave Grusin albums
Henry Mancini tribute albums